West Tytherley is a village and civil parish in the Test Valley district of Hampshire, England. Its nearest town is Stockbridge, which lies approximately 6 miles (10 km) north-east from the village, although its post town is Salisbury.  The parish shares a joint parish council with the neighbouring parish of Frenchmoor.

The church of  St Winfrith in East Dean, Hampshire has a 15th century font from West Tytherley churchyard.

References

External links

Parish website

Villages in Hampshire
Civil parishes in Hampshire
Test Valley